is a Japanese anime series based on the manga of the same name, written by Takaya Kagami and illustrated by Yamato Yamamoto with storyboards by Daisuke Furuya. It is produced by Wit Studio, directed by Daisuke Tokudo and written by Hiroshi Seko. Kagami drafted the original story for episodes with materials not yet serialized in the manga and supervising the scripts until the anime's final episode. The series is set in a post-apocalyptic world caused a "human-made" virus, killing the world's populace and sparing all children under the age of thirteen. It is at this time that vampires emerge from the recesses of the earth, likely followed by age-old horrors of the dark thought only to be myth. An orphaned boy named Yūichirō Hyakuya joins the human military to avenge the death of his family and rescue his best friend Mikaela from the vampires.

On December 12, 2014, it was announced the series would run in two split cours (quarters of the year). The first would air in 2015 from April to June and the second from October to December, with both cours having twelve episodes each. The second cour of would be titled . The series premiered on Tokyo MX, MBS, TV Aichi and BS11 at their respective time slots. NBCUniversal Entertainment Japan is releasing the first cour in Blu-ray and DVD formats in Japan starting on June 24, 2015, across four volumes. A six minutes omake anime specials adapted from the omake featured in the original manga, included in each Blu-ray/DVD volume titled .

On March 31, 2015, it was announced that Funimation has licensed the series for streaming and home video release in North America. Hulu has streamed the series that same day. On May 13, 2015, Funimation announced that the English broadcast dub will stream every Wednesday on its "Dubble Talk" streaming block. The anime series was later broadcast in the United Kingdom on February 15, 2018.

Episode list

Seraph of the End: Vampire Reign (cour one)

Seraph of the End: Battle in Nagoya (cour two)

Original video animation

Home media

Japanese release

English release

Music

The series' soundtrack was composed by Hiroyuki Sawano, Takafumi Wada, Asami Tachibana and Megumi Shiraishi. The first soundtrack album was released on July 15, 2015, containing two discs: the first disc contained 14 tracks all composed by Sawano, while the second disc contained 19 tracks composed by Wada, Tachibana and Shiraishi. A second soundtrack album was released on January 27, 2016, containing 17 tracks composed by Sawano, Wada, Tachibana and Shiraishi.

Sawano produced and composed the opening and ending theme songs in the first cour of the anime series, titled "X.U." and "scaPEGoat", respectively. As part of Sawano's vocal song project "SawanoHiroyuki[nZk]", for the first cour, the opening song is performed by SawanoHiroyuki[nZk]:Gemie, while the ending song is performed by SawanoHiroyuki[nZk]:Yosh. Both themes were released in Japan on a CD on May 20, 2015.

Track listing
All music in the first disc of Seraph of the End Original Soundtrack were composed by Hiroyuki Sawano.

References

Seraph of the End